The genus Ornithogalum contains about 180 species .

The genus Ornithogalum is within the tribe Ornithogaleae of the subfamily Scilloideae, in the family Asparagaceae of the order Asparagales.

Species

Ornithogalum abyssinicum Fresen.
Ornithogalum adseptentrionesvergentulum U.Müll.-Doblies & D.Müll.-Doblies
Ornithogalum aetfatense U.Müll.-Doblies & D.Müll.-Doblies
Ornithogalum alatum Turrill
Ornithogalum alpigenum Stapf
Ornithogalum amblyocarpum Zahar.
Ornithogalum amphibolum Zahar.
Ornithogalum anamurense Speta
Ornithogalum anatolicum Zahar.
Ornithogalum anguinum F.M.Leight. ex Oberm.
Ornithogalum annae-ameliae U.Müll.-Doblies & D.Müll.-Doblies
Ornithogalum apiculatum Zahar.
Ornithogalum arabicum L. – Star-of-Bethlehem
Ornithogalum arcuatum Steven
Ornithogalum arianum Lipsky in B.A.Fedtschenko & al.
Ornithogalum armeniacum Baker
Ornithogalum atticum Boiss. & Heldr.
Ornithogalum baeticum Boiss.
Ornithogalum balansae Boiss.
Ornithogalum baurii Baker in W.H.Harvey & auct. suc. (eds.)
Ornithogalum benguellense Baker
Ornithogalum bicornutum F.M.Leight.
Ornithogalum boucheanum (Kunth) Asch.
Ornithogalum bourgaeanum Jord. & Fourr.
Ornithogalum britteniae F.M.Leight. ex Oberm.
Ornithogalum broteroi M.Laínz
Ornithogalum bungei Boiss.
Ornithogalum campanulatum U.Müll.-Doblies & D.Müll.-Doblies
Ornithogalum candicans (Baker) J.C.Manning & Goldblatt (syn. Galtonia candicans) – Summer Hyacinth, Cape Hyacinth
Ornithogalum capillaris J.M.Wood & M.S.Evans
Ornithogalum cernuum Baker in D.Oliver & auct. suc. (eds.)
Ornithogalum chetikianum Uysal
Ornithogalum chionophilum Holmboe
Ornithogalum ciliiferum U.Müll.-Doblies & D.Müll.-Doblies
Ornithogalum collinum Guss.
Ornithogalum comosum L.
Ornithogalum concinnum Salisb.
Ornithogalum conicum Jacq.
Ornithogalum constrictum F.M.Leight.
Ornithogalum convallarioides H.Perrier
Ornithogalum corsicum Jord. & Fourr.
Ornithogalum corticatum Mart.-Azorín
Ornithogalum creticum Zahar.
Ornithogalum cuspidatum Bertol.
Ornithogalum decus-montium G.Will.
Ornithogalum deltoideum Baker
Ornithogalum demirizianum H.Malyer & Koyuncu
Ornithogalum diphyllum Baker
Ornithogalum divergens Boreau
Ornithogalum dolichopharynx U.Müll.-Doblies & D.Müll.-Doblies
Ornithogalum dregeanum Kunth
Ornithogalum dubium Houtt. – Sun Star
Ornithogalum esterhuyseniae Oberm.
Ornithogalum euxinum Speta
Ornithogalum exaratum Zahar.
Ornithogalum exscapum Ten.
Ornithogalum falcatum (G.J.Lewis) J.C.Manning & Goldblatt
Ornithogalum filicaule J.C.Manning & Goldblatt
Ornithogalum fimbriatum Willd.
Ornithogalum fimbrimarginatum F.M.Leight.
Ornithogalum fischerianum Krasch. in V.L.Komarov (ed.)
Ornithogalum fissurisedulum U.Müll.-Doblies & D.Müll.-Doblies
Ornithogalum flexuosum (Thunb.) U.Müll.-Doblies & D.Müll.-Doblies
Ornithogalum fuscescens Boiss. & Gaill. in P.E.Boissier
Ornithogalum gabrielianiae Agapova
Ornithogalum gambosanum Baker in D.Oliver & auct. suc. (eds.)
Ornithogalum geniculatum Oberm.
Ornithogalum gorenflotii (Moret) Speta
Ornithogalum graciliflorum K.Koch
Ornithogalum gracillimum R.E.Fr.
Ornithogalum graecum Zahar.
Ornithogalum graminifolium Thunb.
Ornithogalum gregorianum U.Müll.-Doblies & D.Müll.-Doblies
Ornithogalum gussonei Ten.
Ornithogalum haalenbergense U.Müll.-Doblies & D.Müll.-Doblies
Ornithogalum hajastanum Agapova
Ornithogalum hallii Oberm.
Ornithogalum hispidulum U.Müll.-Doblies & D.Müll.-Doblies
Ornithogalum hispidum Hornem.
Ornithogalum hyrcanum Grossh.
Ornithogalum imereticum Sosn.
Ornithogalum immaculatum Speta
Ornithogalum improbum Speta
Ornithogalum inclusum F.M.Leight.
Ornithogalum iranicum Zahar.
Ornithogalum iraqense Feinbrun
Ornithogalum isauricum O.D.Düsen & Sümbül
Ornithogalum joschtiae Speta
Ornithogalum juncifolium Jacq.
Ornithogalum kuereanum Speta
Ornithogalum kurdicum Bornm.
Ornithogalum lanceolatum Labill.
Ornithogalum lebaense van Jaarsv.
Ornithogalum leeupoortense U.Müll.-Doblies & D.Müll.-Doblies
Ornithogalum libanoticum Boiss.
Ornithogalum lithopsoides van Jaarsv.
Ornithogalum longicollum U.Müll.-Doblies & D.Müll.-Doblies
Ornithogalum luschanii Stapf
Ornithogalum lychnite Speta
Ornithogalum macrum Speta
Ornithogalum maculatum Jacq. – Snake Flower
Ornithogalum magnum Krasch. & Schischk. in V.L.Komarov (ed.)
Ornithogalum mater-familias U.Müll.-Doblies & D.Müll.-Doblies
Ornithogalum mekselinae Varol
Ornithogalum monophyllum Baker in W.H.Harvey & auct. suc. (eds.)
Ornithogalum montanum Cirillo in M.Tenore
Ornithogalum multifolium Baker
Ornithogalum munzurense Speta
Ornithogalum mysum Speta
Ornithogalum nallihanense Y?ld. & Do?ru-Koca
Ornithogalum namaquanulum U.Müll.-Doblies & D.Müll.-Doblies
Ornithogalum nanodes F.M.Leight.
Ornithogalum narbonense L. – Pyramidal Star-of-Bethlehem
Ornithogalum navaschinii Agapova
Ornithogalum naviculum W.F.Barker ex Oberm.
Ornithogalum neopatersonia J.C.Manning & Goldblatt
Ornithogalum neurostegium Boiss. & Blanche in P.E.Boissier
Ornithogalum nivale Boiss.
Ornithogalum niveum Aiton
Ornithogalum nurdaniae Bagci & Savran
Ornithogalum nutans L. – Drooping Star-of-Bethlehem
Ornithogalum ocellatum Speta
Ornithogalum oligophyllum E.D.Clarke
Ornithogalum oreoides Zahar.
Ornithogalum orthophyllum Ten.
Ornithogalum ostrovicense F.K.Mey.
Ornithogalum paludosum Baker
Ornithogalum pamphylicum O.D.Düsen & Sümbül
Ornithogalum pascheanum Speta
Ornithogalum pedicellare Boiss. & Kotschy in F.J.A.Unger & C.G.T.Kotschy
Ornithogalum perdurans A.P.Dold & S.A.Hammer
Ornithogalum persicum Hausskn. ex Bornm.
Ornithogalum pilosum L.f.
Ornithogalum polyphyllum Jacq.
Ornithogalum ponticum Zahar.
Ornithogalum princeps (Baker) J.C.Manning & Goldblatt (syn. Galtonia princeps)
Ornithogalum pruinosum F.M.Leight.
Ornithogalum puberulum Oberm.
Ornithogalum pullatum F.M.Leight.
Ornithogalum pumilum Zahar.
Ornithogalum pycnanthum Wendelbo
Ornithogalum pyramidale L.
Ornithogalum pyrenaicum L. – Bath Asparagus, Prussian Asparagus, Spiked Star-of-Bethlehem
Ornithogalum refractum Kit. ex Schltdl. in C.L.von Willdenow
Ornithogalum regale (Hilliard & B.L.Burtt) J.C.Manning & Goldblatt (syn. Galtonia regalis)
Ornithogalum reverchonii Lange in H.M.Willkomm
Ornithogalum rogersii Baker in W.H.Harvey & auct. suc. (eds.)
Ornithogalum rossouwii U.Müll.-Doblies & D.Müll.-Doblies
Ornithogalum rotatum U.Müll.-Doblies & D.Müll.-Doblies
Ornithogalum rupestre L.f.
Ornithogalum samariae Zahar.
Ornithogalum sanandajense Maroofi
Ornithogalum sandrasicum Y?ld.
Ornithogalum sardienii van Jaarsv.
Ornithogalum saundersiae Baker – Giant Chincherinchee
Ornithogalum sephtonii Hilliard & B.L.Burtt
Ornithogalum sessiliflorum Desf.
Ornithogalum sigmoideum Freyn & Sint.
Ornithogalum sintenisii Freyn
Ornithogalum sorgerae Wittmann
Ornithogalum spetae Wittmann
Ornithogalum sphaerocarpum A.Kern.
Ornithogalum sphaerolobum Zahar.
Ornithogalum subcoriaceum L.Bolus
Ornithogalum sumbulianum O.D.Düsen & Deniz
Ornithogalum synadelphicum U.Müll.-Doblies & D.Müll.-Doblies
Ornithogalum thermophilum F.M.Leight.
Ornithogalum thunbergii Kunth
Ornithogalum thyrsoides Jacq. – Chincherinchee
Ornithogalum transcaucasicum Miscz. ex Grossh.
Ornithogalum trichophyllum Boiss.
Ornithogalum tropicale Baker
Ornithogalum uluense Speta
Ornithogalum umbellatum L. – Common Star-of-Bethlehem
Ornithogalum umbratile Tornad. & Garbari
Ornithogalum vasakii Speta
Ornithogalum verae U.Müll.-Doblies & D.Müll.-Doblies
Ornithogalum viridiflorum (I.Verd.) J.C.Manning & Goldblatt (syn. Galtonia viridiflora)
Ornithogalum visianicum Tomm.
Ornithogalum wiedemannii Boiss.
Ornithogalum woronowii Krasch. in V.L.Komarov (ed.)
Ornithogalum xanthochlorum Baker in W.H.Harvey & auct. suc. (eds.)
Ornithogalum zebrinellum U.Müll.-Doblies & D.Müll.-Doblies

Organisation 

These species have at various times been organised into sections or subgera or the entire genus split into separate genera, depending on the classification system used. For instance the three species O. broteroi Lainz, O. concinnum Salisb. and O. reverchonii Lange may be considered as a subgenus of Ornithogalum (subg. Cathissa (Salisb.) Baker or as a separate genus, Cathissa Salisb..

References

Bibliography

External links

List
Ornithogalum